The 1979 United Bank Classic, also known as the Denver WCT, was a men's tennis tournament played on indoor carpet courts in Denver, Colorado in the United States that was part of the 1979 Grand Prix circuit. It was the eighth edition of the tournament and took place from February 19 through February 25, 1979. Sixth-seeded Wojciech Fibak won the singles competition.

Finals

Singles
 Wojciech Fibak defeated  Victor Amaya 6–4, 6–1
 It was Fibak's 1st singles title of the year and the 7th of his career.

Doubles
 Stan Smith /  Bob Lutz defeated  Wojciech Fibak /  Tom Okker 7–6, 6–3

References

External links
 ITF tournament edition details

United Bank Classic
Indoor tennis tournaments
United Bank Classic
United Bank Classic
United Bank Classic